This is a list of lists of websites, sorted by type and subject, including comparisons and other lists of lists.

By type

By subject

Blocked
 Blocked in Belgium
 Blocked in China
 Blocked in India
 Blocked in Russia
 Blocked in Singapore
 Blocked in the United Kingdom

Other
 List of websites founded before 1995
 List of most visited websites